The Tupinambá are one of the various Tupi ethnic groups that inhabited present-day Brazil since before the conquest of the region by Portuguese colonial settlers. In the first years of contact with the Portuguese, the Tupinambás lived in the whole Eastern coast of Brazil, and the name was also applied to other Tupi-speaking groups such as the Tupiniquim, Potiguara, Tupinambá, Temiminó, Caeté, Tabajara, Tamoio, and Tupinaé, among others. 

In an exclusive sense, it can be applied to the Tupinambá peoples who once inhabited the right shore of the São Francisco river in the Recôncavo Baiano and from the Cabo de São Tomé in Rio de Janeiro to the town of São Sebastião in São Paulo. Their language survives today in the form of Nheengatu.

History 
Hundreds of years before the arrival of the Portuguese, the Tupinambá are said to have migrated from the South coast of Brazil to the Northern coast for the sake of better hunting and agricultural opportunities. From here they settled into communities that would sustain a population of about 100 people. The size and strength of the communities made them infamous in combat, but left them with very few alliances. It was in part due to this lack of alliances that the Portuguese were able to conquer the group. 

The Tupinambás were abundantly described in André Thevet's 1572 Cosmographie universelle (English: The New Found World, or Antarctike), in Jean de Léry's Histoire d'un voyage faict en la terre du Brésil  (English: History of a Voyage to the Land of Brazil) (1578), and Hans Staden's Warhaftige Historia und beschreibung eyner Landtschafft der Wilden Nacketen (English: True History: An Account of Cannibal Captivity in Brazil), in which he describes the Tupinamba practicing cannibalism. Thevet and Léry were an inspiration for Montaigne's famous essay Of Cannibals, and influenced the creation of the myth of the "noble savage" during the Enlightenment.

The Tupinambá may have given their name to the common French word for the Jerusalem Artichoke, the topinambour.

Cultural practices 
The Tupinambá were a group reliant upon agriculture for most of their resources, utilizing the slash-and-burn technique in their practice.  Both women and men were known to work in the fields, with the women often being the ones to till the soil before men would carry out their duties. However, the Tupinambá weren't limited to farming. They were known to hunt, fish, and gather resources as well, though not to the extent of their agricultural labors.

Demographics 
There are two remaining regions inhabited by the Tupinambá. The Tupinambá of Olivença live in the Atlantic Forest region of southern Bahia. Its area is 10 kilometers north of the city of Ilhéus and extends from the sea coast of the village of Olivença to the Serra das Trempes and Serra do Padeiro. The other group lives in the low Tapajós in the Brazilian state of Pará.

Gallery

References

Sources
Léry, Jean, and Janet Whatley. History of a Voyage to the Land of Brazil, Otherwise Called America. Berkeley: University of California Press, 1990. Print.

Extinct languages of South America
Colonial Brazil
Tupí people
Indigenous people of South America
Indigenous people of Eastern Brazil